Mirna Mohsen Abdelghany Mohamed Youssef (born 5 February 1996), known as Merna Mohsen, is an Egyptian footballer who plays as a midfielder for Aviation Club and the Egypt women's national team. She has a football academy for a young children that she runs with Egypt teammate Mervat Farouk.

Club career
Mohsen has played for Tayaran in Egypt.

International career
Mohsen capped for Egypt at senior level during the 2016 Africa Women Cup of Nations.

References

External links

1996 births
Living people
Footballers from Cairo
Egyptian women's footballers
Women's association football midfielders
Egypt women's international footballers